Squad 85 is an American comedy series created by Gregory Bonsignore that premiered on November 13, 2012 on Justin Lin's YOMYOMF Network.  The series premise establishes that, "In 1985 the Los Angeles Police Department experimented with a secret Time-Travel division, catapulting four of L.A.'s finest 25 years into the future.  That future... is NOW!"  Wherein four cops from 1985 time travel to present day, meeting their Chief and Bobby a new recruit to form their own police squad.  The series satirizes many 1980s Cop tropes as well as other movies and shows.

Squad 85 has received acclaim from critics and has gained a cult following.  They have finished photography on Series 1.

The Trailer debuted November 5, 2012.

Cast and characters 

The show focuses on an ensemble of police working out of an old graffiti-tatted L.A. squad house.

The Squad
 Bobby "The Rookie" (Christopher Larkin)
 Rusty "The Heartthrob" (Travis Van Winkle)
 Tori "...disguises?" (Ceci Fernandez)
 Bronx "The Muscle" (Gregory Bonsignore)
 Wheels "The Brains" (Milauna Jemai)
 The Chief "Undercover Asian Woman" (Jeff Biehl)

Additional cast
 Arch-Villain "Alan" Rickman (Parvesh Cheena)
 The Commissioner (Diedrich Bader)
 Special Needs Nathan (RJ Mitte)
 Luis (Armand Vasquez)
 The Assistant Principal (Rizwan Manji)
 Rogers (Bryan Coffee)
 Macey (Jeff Hiller)
 Rachel (Jen Winters)
 The Reporter (Sonal Shah)
 The Scientist (Danny Pudi)
 The Dancer (Ethan Zachery Scott)

Episodes 
 Episode 1: Out With the New:

A Police Academy grad is assigned to a top-secret Squad, and is immediately on the case of a new drug ring at Dukakis High.
 Episode 2: It's Not the Work, It's the Stares:

To see the crime scene, the Squad goes undercover, unnecessarily, as call girls... 80′s call girls.
 Episode 3: Special Ops:

The Squad heads back to Dukakis High to interrogate the most surprising of drug dealers (Guest star: RJ Mitte – Breaking Bad).

References and sources 

Sources
 http://collider.com/squad-85-set-visit/210837/
 http://instinctmagazine.com/blogs/blog/new-cop-comedy-webseries-squad-85-premieres-tonight
 http://www.Squad85.com
 https://www.youtube.com/yomyomf
 https://www.imdb.com/title/tt2502428/
 http://www.vulture.com/2012/11/squad-85.html
 http://www.hotterinhollywood.com/original/2012/11/on-the-set-of-the-time-traveling-high-school-cop-comedy-squad-85.html

2009 web series debuts
Television shows set in Los Angeles